Jarl Martin Alfredius (3 January 1943 – 31 March 2009) was a Swedish journalist and newsreader at Swedish Television. Alfredius started his career on the radio news show Dagens Eko, and was recruited to television news show Aktuellt in 1986. Alfredius also did TV shows for the Kunskapskanalen in 2004. He remained a news presenter at SVT until July 2008, when he was diagnosed with prostate cancer. Alfredius died aged 66 on 31 March 2009 in Stockholm, due to complications from his disease.

References 

1943 births
2009 deaths
Deaths from cancer in Sweden
Deaths from prostate cancer
Swedish television hosts
Swedish radio personalities
Swedish television journalists
20th-century Swedish journalists